In theatre, house management concerns the selling of tickets, the ushering of patrons in front of house areas, and the maintenance and management of the theatre building. House management staff usually work for the theatre, under the supervision of the house manager, and not for the theatrical troupe which is occupying it. Often in regional or smaller theatres the responsibility falls under the aegis of the marketing department or patron services. In any case, house management works closely with the production management team for the presentation of the theatrical production.

Stagecraft
Theatrical occupations
Theatrical management